(officially Hiro-o Station) is a subway station on the  in Minato, Tokyo operated by the Tokyo subway operator Tokyo Metro. The station is named after the adjacent Hiroo neighborhood in Shibuya ward, though the station is entirely located in Minami-Azabu.

Lines
The station is numbered "H03", and is 17.8 km from the northern end of the line at Kita-Senju.

Station layout
The underground station consists of two opposed side platforms serving two tracks.

Platforms

Exits

The station has four exits, numbered 1 to 4. Exit 1 is convenient for visitors to the Arisugawa-no-miya Memorial Park, the Tokyo Metropolitan Library, and the Kitazato Research Hospital. Exit 2 serves those going to the Hiroo shopping arcade, University of the Sacred Heart or the Tokyo Metropolitan Hiroo Hospital. Exit 3 is near the Minato word Kōgai Elementary School. Exit 4 newly opened in April 2016. It is closest to the International School of the Sacred Heart, Hiroo Gakuen Junior & Senior High School, Japan Red CrossNursing College or Medical Center and the Minato Ward Kōryō Junior High School. Both Exit 3 and 4 are closest to the Nishi-Azabu, Minami-Aoyama district.

History
The station opened on 25 March 1964.

The station facilities were inherited by Tokyo Metro after the privatization of the Teito Rapid Transit Authority (TRTA) in 2004.

Passenger statistics
In fiscal 2019, the station was used by an average of 62,588 passengers daily. The passenger figures for previous years are as shown below.

Surrounding area

Hiroo is a desirable upscale residential area with convenient access to a variety of popular areas in Tokyo. It is located on the borders of Shibuya and Minato wards in Tokyo. Hiroo is within walking distance of the nightlife district Roppongi, as well as trendy shopping and dining areas like Ebisu, Azabu Juban, and Daikanyama.

Hiroo is home to many expatriates and professionals working in Tokyo. There are many embassies and several international schools in the area. The German Embassy is a short walk from the station. Hiroo is home to the National Azabu Supermarket, an upscale grocery store which features foreign brands. It closed in October 2011 for rebuilding, and reopened in August 2012.

The Hiroo Shopping street offers a mix of traditional Japanese craft stores and modern boutiques. The Mormon Tokyo Japan Temple is close to Hiroo Station, as is Arisugawa-no-miya Memorial Park. Tokyo Metropolitan Library is located in Arisugawa-no-miya Memorial Park.

References

External links

  
  

Railway stations in Japan opened in 1964
Tokyo Metro Hibiya Line
Hiroo